Bagaces is a district of the Bagaces canton, in the Guanacaste province of Costa Rica.

Geography 
Bagaces has an area of  km² and an elevation of  metres.

Communities
The district includes the towns of Bagaces, Pijije, Montenegro, Montano, and Salitral.

Demographics 

For the 2011 census, Bagaces had a population of  inhabitants.

Transportation

Road transportation 
The Inter-American Highway runs east–west through the middle of the district.

The district is covered by the following road routes:
 National Route 1
 National Route 164
 National Route 165
 National Route 922
 National Route 923

References 

Districts of Guanacaste Province
Populated places in Guanacaste Province